Budvar Arena is an indoor sporting arena located in České Budějovice, Czech Republic. It is used as the home ice of Motor České Budějovice, which currently plays in the 1st Czech Republic Hockey League. The arena opened in October 1946 and has since undergone several renovations, being almost completely rebuilt in 2002. The current capacity of the arena is 6,421 people.

References

Indoor ice hockey venues in the Czech Republic
Buildings and structures in České Budějovice
1946 establishments in Czechoslovakia
Sports venues completed in 1946
20th-century architecture in the Czech Republic